Borotín is a market town in Tábor District in the South Bohemian Region of the Czech Republic. It has about 700 inhabitants.

Administrative parts
Villages of Boratkov, Chomoutova Lhota, Hatov, Kamenná Lhota, Libenice, Nový Kostelec, Pejšova Lhota, Pikov, Předbojov and Sychrov are administrative parts of Borotín.

Geography
It lies in the Vlašim Uplands. There are several ponds in the municipal territory.

History
The first written mention of Borotín is 1356. However, an old seal with the year 1333 was found, and according to the historians' theory, this is the year when Borotín was promoted to a market town. The church was first documented in 1373.

Sights
The landmark of Borotín is the Church of the Ascension of the Lord. It was built in the mid-14th century. Despite reconstructions in 1796 and 1863, it has a preserved Romanesque nave and Gothic tower.

The romantic ruins of Borotín Castle are located on the shore of the Starozámecký Pond. It was built in the 14th century. In 1623, during the Thirty Years' War, the castle was burned down. In the first half of the 19th century, part of the castle was demolished and the stone was used for construction purposes by villagers. The rest of the cylindrical tower and the adjacent Gothic palace have been preserved from the castle.

References

External links

Populated places in Tábor District
Market towns in the Czech Republic